The great woolly horseshoe bat (Rhinolophus luctus) is a species of bat in the family Rhinolophidae.

It is endemic to Indonesia. The northern woolly horseshoe bat (R. perniger), Malaysian woolly horseshoe bat (R. morio), and Andersen's woolly horseshoe bat (R. foetidus) were previously classified in this species but have since been reclassified as their own species, and other populations have been described as distinct species of their own: the Selangor woolly horseshoe bat (R. luctoides).

References 

Rhinolophidae
Bats of Asia
Bats of Southeast Asia
Bats of Indonesia
Endemic fauna of Indonesia
Fauna of Sumatra
Mammals of Borneo
Least concern biota of Asia
Mammals described in 1835
Taxonomy articles created by Polbot
Taxa named by Coenraad Jacob Temminck

Bats of India